Arkadi Aleksandrovich Akopyan (born 11 May 1984) is a former Russian professional footballer.

Club career
He made his Russian Football National League debut for FC Volgar-Gazprom Astrakhan on 16 May 2005 in a game against FC Chkalovets-1936 Novosibirsk.

External links
 
 

1984 births
People from Krymsky District
Living people
Russian footballers
FC Chernomorets Novorossiysk players
FC Lada-Tolyatti players
FC Fakel Voronezh players
FC Volgar Astrakhan players
Russian people of Armenian descent
FC Metallurg Lipetsk players
Association football midfielders
FC Dynamo Bryansk players
FC Spartak-UGP Anapa players
Sportspeople from Krasnodar Krai